The J. W. and Rachel Newman House and Bunkhouse near Jerome, Idaho was built in the 1920s by sheep rancher and stonemason Bill Darrah.  It was listed on the National Register of Historic Places in 1983.  The listing included two contributing buildings.

It includes a lava rock house and a lava rock bunkhouse that was used for workers and for food storage. Mortar makes wide joints in the wall, as mortar is brought out to the face of the stones. It has a gable roof with narrow eaves.

References

Residential buildings on the National Register of Historic Places in Idaho
Houses completed in 1920
Houses in Jerome County, Idaho
National Register of Historic Places in Jerome County, Idaho